The 2018 Colonial Athletic Association women's basketball tournament is a postseason event that was held from March 7–10, 2018 at the Daskalakis Athletic Center in Philadelphia. The champion received an automatic bid to the 2018 NCAA tournament.

Seeds

Schedule

Bracket

See also
 2018 CAA men's basketball tournament

References

External links
 2018 CAA Women's Basketball Championship

Colonial Athletic Association women's basketball tournament
 
CAA
Basketball competitions in Philadelphia
Women's sports in Pennsylvania
College basketball tournaments in Pennsylvania
2018 in Philadelphia